Snodgrass Hill is a summit in Walker County, Georgia.

Snodgrass Hill was named for George Washington Snodgrass, a pioneer who settled there.

Snodgrass Hill was involved in the Battle of Chickamauga and was fought at over on September 20, 1863.

See also
Chickamauga and Chattanooga National Military Park

References

Mountains of Walker County, Georgia
Mountains of Georgia (U.S. state)